Keith Bernard Pritchett (born 8 November 1953) is a Scottish former professional footballer. He played as a left back for several Football League clubs, most notably Watford, playing a part in their rise from the Fourth Division to the First Division. He finished his playing career in New Zealand, and managed the New Zealand national team from 1996 to 1997.

Playing career
Glaswegian Pritchett spent six years with Watford, playing for them in all four divisions of the Football League. He also played for Wolverhampton Wanderers, Doncaster Rovers, Queens Park Rangers, Brentford and Blackpool. He finished his playing career in New Zealand, firstly at Mount Roskill, and later as player-manager of Waitakere City.

Management career
Pritchett managed the New Zealand national team taking charge for the first time in June 1996. New Zealand won two, drew one and lost eight of his 11 games in charge.

He is currently director of football with United Soccer 1, New Zealand's northernmost football federation.

Other
His son, James, represented New Zealand at under-17, under-23 and senior level.

References

1953 births
Living people
Footballers from Glasgow
Wolverhampton Wanderers F.C. players
Doncaster Rovers F.C. players
Queens Park Rangers F.C. players
Brentford F.C. players
Watford F.C. players
Blackpool F.C. players
English Football League players
New Zealand association football coaches
New Zealand national football team managers
Waitakere City FC players
Scottish footballers
Scottish football managers
Scottish expatriate footballers
Expatriate association footballers in New Zealand
Association football defenders
Scottish emigrants to New Zealand